

Matches
Scores and results list France's points tally first.

Touring party

Manager: 
Assistant Manager: 
Captain:

Full backs

Three-quarters

Half-backs

Forwards

France national rugby union team tours of New Zealand
France national rugby union team tours of South Africa
France national rugby union team tours
Rugby union tours of New Zealand
Rugby union tours of South Africa
France rugby union tour of South Africa and New Zealand
France rugby union tour of South Africa and New Zealand
France rugby union tour of South Africa and New Zealand
France rugby union tour
France rugby union tour